Nebria nivalis is a ground beetle in the subfamily Nebriinae. It is found mainly in Scandinavia and northern Russia; it is rare in the British Isles, where it occurs at isolated upland locations in North Wales, northern England, Scotland and the west of Ireland.

In Scandinavia, N. nivalis is found almost exclusively around the margins of snowfields. In the Scottish Cairngorms it has been observed foraging on snow, especially at night.

References

nivalis
Beetles of Europe
Beetles described in 1790